Kaja Hanevold (born 15 May 1980, in Asker) is a Norwegian former competitive figure skater who skates professionally. She is a five-time Norwegian national champion and qualified to the free skate at three ISU Championships – 1996 Junior Worlds in Brisbane, Australia; 1999 Europeans in Prague, Czech Republic; and 2000 Europeans in Vienna, Austria.

Hanevold retired from competitive figure skating following the 2001–2002 season. She has skated professionally on the Norwegian series of Dancing on Ice.

Programs

Results

References

External links

Navigation

Norwegian female single skaters
1980 births
Living people
People from Asker
Sportspeople from Viken (county)
21st-century Norwegian women